The 2001 WUSA Founders Cup, also known as Founders Cup I, was the first championship match in Women's United Soccer Association history, played between Bay Area CyberRays and the Atlanta Beat to decide the champion of the league's inaugural season. The game was played in bright sunshine at Foxboro Stadium in Foxborough, Massachusetts on August 25, 2001. Bay Area CyberRays defeated the Beat 4–2 on a penalty shootout when the match finished 3–3 after sudden death extra time.

Pre-match

Ticket prices for the final started at $15 and were also available at $28 and $45, with a discount for group purchases.

Atlanta's star player Sun Wen had been afflicted by injuries to her left knee and ankle and was only fit enough to be a substitute. She had entered the semi final victory over Philadelphia Charge to decisive effect, scoring a goal and assisting another for Cindy Parlow as Atlanta recovered from 2–0 down to win 3–2.

Match

Statistics

Source

References

2001 Women's United Soccer Association season